Streptomyces oryziradicis is a bacterium species from the genus of Streptomyces which has been isolated from rhizosphereic soil of a rice plant (Oryza sativa L.) from the Northeast Agricultural University in Harbin in China.

See also 
 List of Streptomyces species

References 

oryziradicis
Bacteria described in 2020